Anthrax toxin receptor 1 (ANTXR1 or also known asTEM8) is a protein that in humans is encoded by the ANTXR1 gene. Its molecular weight is predicted as about 63kDa.

The  protein encoded by this gene is a type I transmembrane protein and is a tumor-specific endothelial marker that has been implicated in colorectal cancer. This protein has been shown to also be a docking protein or receptor for Bacillus anthracis toxin, the causative agent of the disease, anthrax. The binding of the protective antigen (PA) component, of the tripartite anthrax toxin, to this receptor protein mediates delivery of toxin components to the cytosol of cells. Once inside the cell, the other two components of anthrax toxin, edema factor (EF) and lethal factor (LF) disrupt normal cellular processes. Three alternatively spliced variants have been described.

See also
 Anthrax toxin

References

External links

Further reading

Single-pass transmembrane proteins